The 2004 T in the Park were held on Saturday 10 July and Sunday 11 July 2004. It attracted approximately 60,000 people on both the Saturday and Sunday. The two biggest stages were the Main Stage and the NME Stage, along with four tents which included the Slam Tent and the King Tut's Tent.

Originally David Bowie was supposed to headline the main stage on the Saturday evening, but had to pull out due to illness.  The Darkness were promoted to headline the main stage and played to a small crowd. Many music fans went to see Muse on the NME stage instead. The Strokes closed the festival, headlining the main stage on the Sunday night.

Line up
The 2004 line-up was as follows:

Main Stage

NME Stage

King Tut's Tent

X-Tent

Slam Tent

T Break Stage

Links

References

2004 in Scotland
2004 in British music
T in the Park
July 2004 events in the United Kingdom
2004 music festivals